Loose is a British independent record label based in Ladbroke Grove, London.

In 1998, Loose was formed from the vinyl only record label, Vinyl Junkie, which was set up in 1994 by Tom Bridgewater.

Since 1998, Loose has released music by the following artists: Sturgill Simpson, Giant Sand, Townes Van Zandt, Steve Earle, M Ward, Mark Mulcahy, Neko Case, The Handsome Family, The Felice Brothers, Dawes, Deer Tick, Hurray For The Riff Raff, Justin Townes Earle and Grand Drive.

Current artists 
 The Americans
 Barna Howard
 Carson McHone
 Courtney Marie Andrews
 Damien Jurado
 Danny and the Champions of the World
 Frankie Lee
 Frontier Ruckus
 Gill Landry
 The Handsome Family
 Ian Felice (The Felice Brothers)
 Israel Nash	
 Jim White
 Joana Serrat
 Native Harrow
 Sons of Bill
 Treetop Flyers
 Vetiver
 Willard Grant Conspiracy
 William The Conqueror

Discography 

 VJCD001/VJ1: Various - Vinyl Junkie Country
 VJCD002/VJLP002: Various - Cowpunks
 VJCD003/VJLP003: Various - Jukebox Cowboy (released 5 May 1997)
 VJCD004: Various - New Sounds of the Old West (released 9 February 1998)
 VJCD105: The Handsome Family - Through The Trees
 VJLP105LTD: The Handsome Family - Through The Trees 20th Anniversary LP
 VJCD106: Red Star Belgrade - End of the Line (released 18 December 1998)
 VJCD107: Grand Drive  - Wrong Notes (single)
 VJCD108: Grand Drive - Road Music
 VJCD109: Mark Mulcahy - Fathering (released 17 May 1999)
 VJCD110: The Handsome Family - Down in the Valley
 VJCD111: Various  New Sounds of the Old West Volume Two
 VJCD112: The Handsome Family - In The Air
 VJCD113: Giant Sand - Chore of Enchantment (released 27 March 2000)
 VJCD114: Neko Case and Her Boyfriend - Furnace Room Lullaby (released 22 February 2000)
 VJCD115: Dakota Suite - Signal Hill (released 29 May 2000)
 VJCD116: Chris Mills - Kiss it Goodbye (released 25 July 2000)
 VJCD117: Jubilee Allstars - Lights of the City
 VJCD118: Grand Drive - True Love and High Adventure
 VJCD119: Hawksley Workman - For Him and the Girls
 VJCD120: Noahjohn - Had a Burning
 VJCD121: Giant Sand - Selections Circa 1990-2000
 VJCD122: Howe - Confluence
 VJCD123: Mark Mulcahy - Smilesunset
 VJCD124: M Ward - End of Amnesia
 VJCD125: Ashley Park - The American Scene
 VJCD126: The Handsome Family - Twilight
 VJCD127: Various - New Sounds of the Old West Volume Three
 VJCD128: The Arlenes - Stuck On Love
 VJCD129: Paul O’Reilly - First Thing in the Morning
 VJCD130: Vera Cruise - Come Alone and Fall Apart
 VJCD131: The Corn Lund Band - Five Dollar Bill
 VJCD132: Hayden - Skyscraper National Park
 VJCD133: Wiskey Biscuit - Wiskey Biscuit
 VJCD134: Horse Stories - Travelling Mercies (For Troubled Paths)
 VJCD135: The Nick Luca Trio - Little Town
 VJCD136: Chris Mills - The Silver Line
 VJCD137: Noahjohn - Water Hymns
 VJCD138: Jim & Jennee and the Pinetops - One More in the Cabin
 VJCD139: Peter Bruntnell - Ends of the Earth
 VJCD140: Various - Loose Selections
 VJCD141: Steve Turner - Searching for Melody
 VJCD142: Willard Grant Conspiracy - Regard the End
 VJCD143: Horse Stories - One Hundred Waves
 VJCD144: The Handsome Family - Singing Bones
 VJCD145: Peter Bruntnell - Played Out
 VJCD146: Blanche - If We Can't Trust the Doctors...
 VJCD147: Mary Lou Lord - Baby Blue
 VJCD148: Charlemagne - Charlemagne
 VJCD149: Hayden - Elk-Lake Serenade 
 VJCD150: Summer of Mars - Glaciers
 VJCD151: The Arlenes - Going To California
 VJCD152: Toby Burke - Winsome Lonesome
 VJCD153: Jawbone - Dang Blues
 VJCD154: Willard Grant Conspiracy - There but for the Grace of God - A Short History of the Willard Grant Conspiracy
 VJCD155: Roger Dean and the Tin Cup - Cast
 VJCD156: Bap Kennedy - The Big Picture
 VJCD157: Mark Mulcahy - In Pursuit of Your Happiness
 VJCD158: Various - Start Your Own Country
 VJCD159: Peter Bruntnell - Ghost in a Spitfire
 VJCD160: Horse Stories - Everyone's a Photographer
 VJCD161: Jawbone - Hauling
 VJCD162: Willard Grant Conspiracy - Let It Roll
 VJCD163: Corb Lund - Hair in my eyes Like a Highland Steer
 VJCD164: The Mendoza Line - Full of Light and Full of Fire
 VJCD165: Irana George - All Rise
 VJCD166: The Handsome Family - Last Days of Wonder
 VJCD167: Various - Heartworn Highways
 VJCD168: The Last Town Chorus - Wire Waltz
 VJCD169: Blanche - What the Town Needs EP
 VJCD170: Blanche - Little Amber Bottles
 VJCD171/VJLP171: The Felice Brothers - Tonight at the Arizona
 VJLP171RSD: The Felice Brothers - Tonight at the Arizona 20th Anniversary LP
 VJCD172: Various - Country Girl: New Sounds of the Old West Volume Five
 VJCD173: Monkey Swallows the Universe - The Casket Letters
 VJCD174: Grand Drive - Everyone
 VJCD175: Paris Motel - In the Saltpetriere
 VJCD176:
 VJCD177: The Felice Brothers - The Felice Brothers
 VJCD178: Danny & The Champions of the World - Danny and the Champions of the World
 VJCD179: Willard Grant Conspiracy - Pilgrim Road
 VJCD180: Peter Bruntnell - Peter and the Murder of Crows
 VJCD181: Ralfe band - Attic Thieves
 VJCD182: Mr David Viner - Among the Rumours and the Rye
 VJCD183: Miss Lana Rebel - All I Need
 VJCD184: The Duke & the King - Nothing Gold Can Stay
 VJCD185: The Handsome Family - Honey Moon
 VJCD186:
 VJCD187: The R G Morrison - Farewell, My Lovely
 VJCD188: Willard Grant Conspiracy - Paper Covers Stone
 VJCD189: Trevor Moss & Hannah Lou - Trevor Moss & Hannah Lou
 VJCD190: Danny & The Champions of the World - Streets of Our Time
 VJCD191: Hurray For The Riff Raff - Hurray For The Riff Raff
 VJCD192: Jim White - Sounds of the Americans
 VJCD193: The Felice Brothers - Celebration, Florida
 VJCD194/VJLP194: Dawes - Nothing is Wrong
 VJCD195: Various - This is Loose (Loose Label Sampler)
 VJCD196: Jim White - Where it Hits You
 VJCD197: Dawes - North Hills
 VJCD198/VJLP198: Deer Tick
 VJCD9899: Deer Tick - Divine Providence + Tim EP
 VJCD200: Hurray For The Riff Raff - Look Out Mama
 VJDC201: The Wooden Sky - Every Child A Daughter, Every Moon a Sun
 VJCD202: Lucero - Women & Work
 VJCD203: Various - This is Loose II
 VJCD204: Frontier Ruckus - Eternity Dimming
 VJCD205: The Rockingbirds - The Return of the Rockingbirds
 VJCD206:
 VJCD207: Peter Bruntnell - Retrospective
 VJCD208/VJLP208: Jonny Fritz - Dad Country 
 VJCD209/VJLP209: Treetop Flyers - The Mountain Moves
 VJCD210/VJLP210: The Handsome Family - Wilderness
 VJCD211/VJLP211: Willard Grant Conspiracy - Ghost Republic
 VJCD212/VJLP212: Danny & The Champions of the World - Stay True
 VJCD213/VJLP213: Israel Nash Gripka - Rain Plans
 VJCD214/VJLP214: Sturgill Simpson - High Top Mountain
 VJCD215/VJLP215: Vikesh Kapoor - The Ballad of Willy Robbins
 VJCD216/VJLP216: Sturgill Simpson - Metamodern Sounds in Country Music
 VJCD217: Danny & The Champions of the World - Live Champs!
 VJCD218: Justin Townes Earle - Single Mothers
 VJCD219: Justin Townes Earle - Absent Fathers
 VJLP2189: Justin Townes Earle - Single Mothers / Absent Fathers
 VJCD220/VJLP220: Andrew Combs - All These Dreams
 VJCD221/VJLP221: Joe Pug - Windfall
 VJCD222/VJLP222: Danny & The Champions of the World - What Kind of Love
 VJCD223/VJLP223: Barna Howard - Quite A Feelin’
 VJCD224/VJLP224: Frankie Lee - American Dreamer
 VJCD225/VJLP225: Treetop Flyers - Palomino
 VJCD226/VJLP226: Israel Nash - Israel Nash's Silver Season
 VJCD227/VJLP227: Joana Serrat - Cross The Verge
 VJCD228/VJLP228: Courtney Marie Andrews - Honest Life
 VJCD229/VJLP229//VJCD229X: The Handsome Family - Unseen
 VJCD230/VJLP230: Frontier Ruckus - Enter The Kingdom
 VJCD231/VJLP231: Andrew Combs - Canyons of my Mind
 VJCD232/VJLP232: William The Conqueror - Proud Disturber of the Peace
 VJCD233/VJLP233: Danny & The Champions of the World - Brilliant Light
 VJCD234/VJLP234: The Americans - I'll Be Yours
 VJCD235/VJLP235: Ian Felice - In the Kingdom of Dreams
 VJCD236/VJLP236: Courtney Marie Andrews - On My Page
 VJCD237/VJLP237: Joana Serrat - Dripping Springs
 VJCD238/VJLP238: Gill Landry - Love Rides a Dark Horse
 VJCD239/VJLP239: Jim White - Waffles, Triangles and Jesus
 VJCD240/VJLP240/VJLP240LTD: Courtney Marie Andrews - May Your Kindness Remain
 VJCD241/VJLP241/VJLP241LTD: Israel Nash - Lifted
 VJCD242/VJLP242: Sons Of Bill - Oh God Ma’am
 VJCD243/VJLP243: Treetop Flyers - Treetop Flyers
 VJCDTIL4: Various - This is Loose IV
 VJCD244/VJLP244: Andrew Combs - Worried Man
 VJCD245/VJLP245: Willard Grant Conspiracy - Untethered
 VJCD246/VJLP246: William The Conqueror - Bleeding On The Soundtrack
 VJCD247/VJLP247: Carson McHone - Carousel
 VJCD248/VJLP248: Damien Jurado - In The Shape Of A Storm
 VJCD249/VJLP249: Frankie Lee - Stillwater
 VJCD250/VJLP250: Native Harrow - Happier Now
 VJCD251/VJLP251: Vetiver - Up On High
 VJCD252/VJLP252: Gill Landry - Skeleton at the Banquet
 VJCD253/VJLP253: The Handsome Family - Odessa
 VJCD254/VJLP254: The Handsome Family - Milk and Scissors
 VJCD255/VJLP255: Damien Jurado - What's New, Tomboy?
 VJCD256/VJLP256:
 VJCD257/VJLP257: Courtney Marie Andrews - Old Flowers
 VJCD258/VJLP258: Native Harrow - Closeness
 VJCD259/VJLP259: Jim White - Misfit's Jubilee
 VJCD260/VJLP260:
 VJCD261/VJLP261:
 VJCD262/VJLP262:
 VJCD263/VJLP263:
 VJCD264/VJLP264/VJLP264LTD: Israel Nash - Topaz

References

Record labels established in 1998
British independent record labels
Companies based in the Royal Borough of Kensington and Chelsea